Werner Cabrera Campos is a Peruvian politician. He was a Congressman representing Cajamarca for a term between 2006 and 2011, and belongs to the Peruvian Nationalist Party (PNP).

Background
He studied for nine years in the Peruvian National University of Cajamarca.

Political career
in the 2006 elections, he ran for Congress, and was elected on the joint Union for Peru-Peruvian Nationalist Party ticket, representing the Cajamarca Region. After the alliance split, he sat on the Nationalist bench in Congress. While in office, he served on a series of committees relating to technology, education, agriculture, and housing.

Criticism
During his tenure, as a chairman of an education subcommittee in Congress, he was criticized for declining student loans. According to a Spanish language newspaper, Cabrera approved only 188 out of over 400 loans, which the newspaper called a "dismal rating" of only 6.8% of loans approved.

According to the newspaper, his educational background has been criticized by his political opponents, who have deemed it unsatisfactory due to his repeated failure to pass Meteorology and Calculus among other courses. There have also been allegations that his resume failed to detail his repeated efforts to remedy his failed courses and that he kept university furniture from his service as the president of a student organization.

References

Year of birth missing (living people)
Living people
Peruvian Nationalist Party politicians
Union for Peru politicians
Members of the Congress of the Republic of Peru
National University of Cajamarca alumni